ARCS® Foundation, Inc. (Achievement Rewards for College Scientists) is an American nonprofit volunteer women's organization that promotes US competitiveness by providing financial awards to academically outstanding US citizens studying to complete degrees in science, technology, engineering, mathematics (STEM), and health disciplines at 49 of the nation's leading research universities. The organization has awarded more than $115 million to 10,000 scholars since 1958. ARCS Foundation Scholars have produced thousands of research publications and patents, secured billions in grant funding, started science-related companies, and played a significant role in teaching and mentoring young people in the STEM pipeline.

History 

In 1958, a group of visionary women volunteers from Los Angeles, California led by Florence Malouf met with California Institute of Technology President Lee DuBridge to begin a discussion about what could be done to elevate the United States of America's scientific leadership and competitiveness. Together they created a unique partnership between science and society. ARCS Foundation would soon become a model for women's science educational philanthropy.

Focusing on science by investing in scientists, science student graduate school scholarships would soon be seen as a targeted, effective way to further science philanthropy in America.  ARCS Foundation also brought stronger focus to women's leadership in science philanthropy as the organization grew nationally. Initially focused upon its US space program contribution, the Houston and Washington, D.C. Chapters were established, with each Chapter cultivating strong relationships, raising funds and supporting scholars from leading universities in their home states.

As the primary implementer of ARCS Foundation mission, Chapters unite with the national organization as advocates for education and research, and to engage public awareness of science challenges and successes.

ARCS Foundation is still a group of women focused on the future, proud of its dynamic history of giving and growing. ARCS Foundation has grown to more than 1,200 members in 15 Chapters across the United States, all of whom dedicate volunteer hours and financial support on behalf of undergraduate and graduate students of science.

Since its founding, ARCS Foundation has provided more than 10,000 graduate students of science with awards totaling more than $115 million. Though the areas of science, engineering, and medical research have expanded beyond the focus of the US space program contribution, the parameters established by ARCS Foundation's steadfast founders still guide the organization today in the realization of their mission. The main objective was declared on the Caltech campus in Pasadena, CA on September 18, 1958: ". . . raise money for scholarships and fellowships (now known as Scholar Awards) . . . for the support of both undergraduate and graduate students."

Chapters 
ARCS Chapters carry the mission of the organization to different regions of the United States.

The 15 ARCS Chapters are:

 Atlanta 
 Colorado 
 Honolulu 
 Illinois 
 Los Angeles 
 Metro Washington 
 Minnesota 
 Northern California 
 Orange County, California  
 Oregon 
 Phoenix, Arizona 
 Pittsburgh 
 San Diego 
 Seattle 
 Utah

ARCS Scholars 

ARCS Scholars are selected annually by qualifying departments of science, engineering and medical research within ARCS Foundation's 49 academic partner universities and colleges.  ARCS Foundation neither solicits nor accepts applications from potential ARCS Scholars. ARCS Foundation's academic partners identify and select ARCS Scholars who meet the following criteria to be eligible for funding:

 be a United States citizen
 be enrolled in a full-time degree-granting program, majoring in fields of science, engineering or medical research
 have a GPA of 3.5 or higher

Notable Alumni and ARCS Scholar Alumni Hall of Fame 
Notable ARCS Scholars include Albert Greenberg. Other ARCS Scholars have been inducted to the ARCS Alumni Hall of Fame by demonstrating leadership in one or more of the following areas:

 Scientific innovation and discovery
 Recognition by peers
 Mentoring future scientists to fill in the STEM pipeline
 Founding or leading an organization that has had a significant impact on the US economy
 Increasing awareness of the importance of national scientific competitiveness

Members of the ARCS Foundation Scholar Alumni Hall of Fame

Academic Partners/Approved Universities  

ARCS Approved Universities are U.S. universities whose science, technology, engineering, and mathematics departments are ranked in the top 100 in the country.

U.S. universities and colleges where ARCS Scholars are found:

Outcomes

Philanthropic 
Philanthropic accomplishments include:

18,518 awards granted
$115,618,320 total funding

Membership 
Membership accomplishments include:

1,270 members 
10,500 scholars funded 
15 national chapters

References 

Organizations established in 1958
Scholarships in the United States
Educational organizations based in the United States
1958 establishments in California